Canal San Bovo (Canal in local dialect) is a comune (municipality) in Trentino in the northern Italian Region Trentino-Alto Adige/Südtirol, located about  north-east of Trento. Canal San Bovo is a typical alpine village; from 1401 to 1918 it was a possession of the Austro-Hungarian Empire.

Twin towns
Civitella Alfedena, Italy

References

Cities and towns in Trentino-Alto Adige/Südtirol